Neonympha areolatus, the Georgia satyr, is a species of brush-footed butterfly in the family Nymphalidae. It is found in North America.

The MONA or Hodges number for Neonympha areolatus is 4576.

References

Further reading

 

Neonympha
Articles created by Qbugbot
Butterflies described in 1797
Butterflies of North America
Taxa named by James Edward Smith